Cristina Crisol (Jean Elizabeth May in real life) is a former film actress from the Philippines, known for her sex appeal.

In the 1980s, she appeared in movies like Kikirut-Kirot (1985) with Liz Alindogan and Edgar Mande, Uhaw Na Uhaw (1985) with Raoul Aragonn, Eden (1985) with Mark Gil, Nude City (1986) with Ernie Garcia and Sarsi Emmanuelle, Donselya (1986) with Zandro Zamora, Di Maghilom Ang Sugat (1986) with Anna Marie Gutierrez, Maureen Mauricio and Gino Antonio, and Paraisong Gubat (1986) with Azenith Briones, Josephine Manuel, Tanya Gomez and Lito Gruet.

Crisol is the daughter of a retired US Navy serviceman and a half Puerto-Rican mother. She was raised in Olongapo. She is now married to a construction worker, and they have two children. She has four children from different relationships and now lives a simple life in Masantol, Pampanga.

Filmography
Jerry Marasigan WPD (1992) - Jestoni Alarcon, Gretchen Barretto
Kumukulong Dugo (1991) - Ronnie Ricketts, Edu Manzano
May Butas Sa Dingding (1988) - Ramon Zamora, Elizabeth Oropesa
Paano Maibabalik Ang Nakaraan? (1987) - Dhouglas Veron, Tony Martinez
Bodyguard: Masyong Bagwisa, Jr. (1986) - Bong Revilla, Ronnie Ricketts
Di Maghilom Ang Sugat (1986) - Anna Marie Gutierrez, Gino Antonio, Maureen Mauricio
Donselya (1986) - Zandro Zamora, Perla Bautista
Mababangis Na Bulaklak (1986) - Mark Joseph
Kulang Sa Dilig (1986) - Lolita Lamas, Kristal Cristobal
Paraisong Gubat (1986) - Tanya Gomez, Azenith Briones
Nude City (1986) - Sarsi Emmanuelle, Ernie Garcia, Vida Verde, Brandy Ayala
Ang Galit Ko'y... Sumagad Sa Laman, Tumagos Sa Buto (1986) - George Estregan, Rowena Ruiz
Unang Gabi (1986) - Maria Isabel Lopez, Orestes Ojeda, Tani Cinco
Bomba Arienda (1985) - Ace Vergel, William Martinez, Carmi Martin, Tom Olivar
Jimbo (1985) - Jess Lapid, Jr., George Estregan
Eden (1985) - Mark Gil, Raoul Aragon, Liz Alindogan
Uhaw Na Uhaw (1985) - Ernie Garcia, Raoul Aragon, Daria Ramirez
Kikirut-kirot (1985) - Liz Alindogan, Edgar Mande, Zandro Zamora
Mga Manikang Hubad (1985) - Rez Cortez, Raoul Aragonn, Conrad Poe, Ursula Marquez, Tessa Tuazon
Manoy, Hindi Ka Na Makakaisa (1985) - Eddie Garcia, Anna Marie Gutierrez, Emily Loren, Angela Perez
Mga Babaeng Rehas (1985) - Irma ALegre, Anna Marie Gutierrez
Cop Brutus Logan, The Crime Buster (1985) - Raoul Aragonn, George Estregan, Hasmin Hassan, Robert Talby

References

External links
Cristina Crisol at video48 blogspot

Living people
20th-century Filipino actresses
Filipino film actresses
Year of birth missing (living people)
Place of birth missing (living people)
People from Olongapo
Actresses from Zambales
Filipino people of American descent
Filipino people of Puerto Rican descent